Carla Quevedo (born 23 April 1988) is an Argentine actress. She is most known for her limited but crucial role in The Secret in Their Eyes, in which she played Liliana Coloto.

Career 
Her acting debut was in the year 2009 in Argentina film directed by Juan José Campanella, The Secret in Their Eyes, winner of the Academy Award for Best Foreign Language Film. It also stars Ricardo Darín, Soledad Villamil, Pablo Rago, and Guillermo Francella. In the film, Quevedo  plays Liliana Coloto a murdered girl around which the story centers. She currently is a designer for the La Belle Rebelle swimsuit line and lives in both New York City and Buenos Aires.

Filmography

Film

Television

Theatre

Accolades 
In 2013, Quevedo won the Best Actress Award at the HollyShorts Film Festival in Los Angeles and was nominated by the Academia Argentina de Letras for the Cóndor de Plata for Best New Actress.

References

External links 

 Carla Quevedo at Cinenacional.com

1988 births
Living people
Actresses from Buenos Aires
Argentine film actresses
20th-century Argentine actresses
21st-century Argentine actresses
Argentine television actresses
Argentine stage actresses